Nigeria competed at the 1992 Summer Olympics in Barcelona, Spain.

Medalists

Competitors
The following is the list of number of competitors in the Games.

Results by event

Athletics
Men's 4 × 400 m Relay
Udeme Ekpeyong, Emmanuel Okoli, Hassan Bosso, and Sunday Bada   
 Heat — 3:00.39
 Final — 3:01.71 (→ 5th place)

Boxing
Men's Flyweight (– 51 kg)
 Moses Malagu
 First Round – Defeated Richard Buttimer (IRL), 12:8 
 Second Round – Lost to Raúl González (CUB), RSC-2

Men's Bantamweight (– 54 kg)
 Mohammed Sabo
 First Round – Defeated Robert Ciba (POL), RSC-3
 Second Round – Defeated Chatree Suwanyod (THA), 16:7 
 Quarterfinals – Lost to Wayne McCullough (IRL), 13:31

Men's Lightweight (– 60 kg)
 Moses Odion
 First Round – Defeated Janos Petrovics (HUN), 18:8 
 Second Round – Lost to Oscar De La Hoya (USA), 4:16

Men's Light Welterweight (– 63.5 kg)
 James Mozez
 First Round – Lost to Arlo Chavez (PHI), 6:12

Men's Welterweight (– 67 kg)
 Tajudeen Sabitu
 First Round – Lost to Francisc Vaştag (ROM), 0:9

Men's Light Middleweight (– 71 kg)
 David Defiagbon
 First Round – Lost to Raúl Márquez (USA), 7:8

Men's Light Heavyweight (– 81 kg)
 Jacklord Jacobs
 First Round – Bye
 Second Round – Lost to Rostislav Zaulichniy (EUN), 8:16

Men's Heavyweight (– 91 kg)
 David Izonritei →  Silver Medal
 First Round – Bye
 Second Round – Defeated Morteza Shiri (IRN), RSC-3 (01:35) 
 Quarterfinals – Defeated Kirk Johnson (CAN), 9:5 
 Semifinals – Defeated David Tua (NZL), 12:7 
 Final – Lost to Félix Savón (CUB), 1:14

Men's Super Heavyweight (+ 91 kg)
 Richard Igbineghu →  Silver Medal
 First Round – Bye 
 Second Round – Defeated Liade Alhassan (GHA), walk-over 
 Quarterfinals – Defeated Gitas Juskevicius (LTU), KO-2
 Semifinals – Defeated Svilen Rusinov (BUL), 9:7 
 Final – Lost to Roberto Balado (CUB), 2:13

Handball

Women's Team Competition
Preliminary round (group A)
 Nigeria – Germany 17-32
 Nigeria – Unified Team 18-26
 Nigeria – United States 21-23
Classification Match
 7th-8th place: Nigeria – Spain 17-26 (→ Eighth and last place)
Team roster
Angela Ajodo
Justina Akpulo
Justina Anyiam
Uzoma Azuka
Barbara Diribe
Eunice Idausa
Chiaka Lauretta Ihebom
Mary Ihedioha
Agustina Nikechi Abi
Mary Nwachukwu
Immaculate Nwaogu
Ngozi Opara
Auta Olivia Sana
Mary Soronadi
Victoria Umunna
Bridget Yamala Egwolosan
Head coach: Anthony Atusu

Swimming
Men's 50m Freestyle
 Musa Bakare
 Heat – 24.13 (→ did not advance, 41st place)

Men's 100m Butterfly
 Musa Bakare
 Heat – 58.36 (→ did not advance, 52nd place)

Women's 50m Freestyle
 Joshua Ikhaghomi
 Heat – 27.53 (→ did not advance, 39th place)

Women's 100m Freestyle
 Joshua Ikhaghomi
 Heat – 1:00.72 (→ did not advance, 42nd place)

See also
 Nigeria at the 1990 Commonwealth Games
 Nigeria at the 1994 Commonwealth Games

References

Official Olympic Reports
International Olympic Committee results database
sports-reference

Nations at the 1992 Summer Olympics
1992
Olympic Games